The Giant Claw is a 1957 American monster film from Columbia Pictures, produced by Sam Katzman, directed by Fred F. Sears, that stars Jeff Morrow and Mara Corday. Both Sears and Katzman were well known as low-budget B film genre filmmakers. The film was released as a double feature with The Night the World Exploded.

Plot
Mitch MacAfee (Morrow), a civil aeronautical engineer, while engaged in a radar test flight near the North Pole, spots an unidentified flying object. Three jet fighter aircraft are scrambled to pursue and identify the object but one aircraft goes missing. Officials are initially angry at MacAfee over the loss of a pilot and jet over what they believe to be a hoax.

When MacAfee and mathematician Sally Caldwell (Corday) fly back to New York, their aircraft also comes under attack by a UFO. With their pilot dead, they crash-land in the Adirondacks, where Pierre Broussard (Lou Merrill), a French-Canadian farmer, comes to their rescue, and reports seeing a giant monster bird he calls La Carcagne. MacAfee's report is met with bewilderment and skepticism, but the military authorities are forced to take his story seriously after several more aircraft disappear. They discover that the gigantic bird "as big as a battleship", purported to come from an antimatter galaxy, is responsible for all the incidents. MacAfee, Caldwell, Dr. Karol Noymann (Edgar Barrier), Gen. Considine (Morris Ankrum), and Gen. Van Buskirk (Robert Shayne) work feverishly to develop a way to defeat the seemingly invincible creature.

The climactic showdown takes place in Manhattan, when the gigantic bird attacks both the Empire State Building and United Nations building. It is defeated by a special type of exotic atom, muonic atoms, deployed from the tail gun position of a B-25 bomber aircraft, which successfully collapses the creature's antimatter shield and allows missiles to hit and kill the monster. The giant bird plummets into the Atlantic Ocean outside New York, and the last sight of it is a claw sinking beneath the ocean.

Cast
 Jeff Morrow as Mitch MacAfee
 Mara Corday as Sally Caldwell
 Morris Ankrum as Lt. Gen Edward Considine
 Lou Merrill as Pierre Broussard (as Louis D. Merrill)
 Edgar Barrier as Dr. Karol Noymann
 Robert Shayne as Gen. Van Buskirk 
 Frank Griffin as Pete - Pilot (as Ruell Shayne)
 Clark Howat as Maj. Bergen
 Morgan Jones as Lieutenant, Radar Officer

Production
According to Richard Harland Smith of Turner Classic Movies, the inspiration for the story may have been taken from media reports about scientific discoveries in the field of particle physics, dealing with matter and antimatter. Other influences included the Japanese film Rodan (1956), and the Samuel Hopkins Adams story "Grandfather and a Winter's Tale", about la Carcagne, the "mythical bird-like banshee from French-Canadian folklore". The Adams story was published in The New Yorker in January 1951.

A character in The Giant Claw (Pierre Broussard) mistakes the menacing bird for la Carcagne, said to be a monster resembling a giant woman with a wolf's head and bat-like black wings and which, like the banshee, is a harbinger of death.

Under the working title Mark of the Claw, principal photography took place at Griffith Park, subbing for the New York-Canada border, with interiors filmed at the Columbia Annex near Monogram Studios from February 1–20, 1957. Katzman originally planned to utilize stop motion effects by Ray Harryhausen, but due to budget constraints, he instead hired a low-budget special effects studio in Mexico City, Mexico to create the mythical creature that would be the showpiece of the production. The result, however, was a poorly made "marionette". The puppet's construction was so underwhelming that a common misconception stating the puppet was made in Mexico City, Mexico for only $50 became very popular. This statement isn't entertained much anymore as there are no credible resources supporting the claim.  

Morrow later confessed in an interview that no one in the film knew what the titular monster looked like until the film's premiere. Morrow himself first saw the film in his hometown, and hearing the audience laugh every time the monster appeared on screen, he left the theater early, embarrassed that anyone there might recognize him (he allegedly went home and began drinking).

In May 1957, Sam Katzman stated in an interview with Variety, that his films at the time had costed between $250,000 to $500,000. Despite the production utilizing Columbia’s B-unit, they had a much larger budget than other contemporaries.

Reception

 
Critical reception was very negative, with film writer and historian Bill Warren commenting, "This would have been an ordinarily bad movie of its type, with a good performance by Jeff Morrow, if the special effects had been industry standard for the time. That, however, is not what happened. The Claw is not just badly rendered, it is hilariously rendered, resembling nothing so much as Warner Bros. cartoon-character Beaky Buzzard. Once seen, you will never forget this awesomely silly creation".

The Giant Claw has been mocked for the quality of its special effects. The menacing bird, in particular, is considered by many to be badly made, being a puppet with a very odd face. Film critic Leonard Maltin noted that the film disappointed for those reasons, "(a) lack of decent special effects ruins the running battle between colossal bird and fighter jets. Big bird is laughable".<ref>Maltin, Leonard. [http://www.tcm.com/tcmdb/title/20087/The-Giant-Claw/ "Leonard Maltin Movie Review: The Giant Claw'."] Turner Classic Movies. Retrieved: April 8, 2015.</ref>TV Guide panned the film, awarding it a score of 1 out of 4, criticizing the film's monster as "preposterous-looking".

Not all reviews of the film were negative. Allmovie gave the film a positive review, stating, "The Giant Claw has a terrible reputation that isn't entirely deserved – to be sure, producer Sam Katzman opted for the cheapest, worst-looking monster that one could imagine, a ridiculous-looking giant bird puppet that makes the movie seem ludicrous. But except for those moments when the title monster is on the screen, the movie isn't bad – so for the first 27 minutes, until it appears for the first time and evokes its first rounds of laughter, the picture is working just fine within the confines of its budget, script, and cast". Allmovie also complimented Morrow's performance as "the best thing in the picture".

Home mediaThe Giant Claw had been a staple of the bootleg video market, with only two official VHS releases (one in the US by Goodtimes Home Video and the other by Screamtime in the United Kingdom).

In October 2007, Sony Pictures Home Entertainment released the film on DVD as part of the two-disc, four-film set, Icons of Horror Collection: Sam Katzman, along with three other films produced by Katzman: Creature with the Atom Brain (1955), The Werewolf (1956) and Zombies of Mora Tau (1957).

On February 25, 2014, Mill Creek Entertainment (under license from Sony Pictures) included the film on the Sci-Fi Creature Classics DVD alongside 20 Million Miles to Earth, It Came from Beneath the Sea, and Mothra.

In 2021, it was released on Blu-ray by Arrow Films as part of the limited edition Cold War Creatures: Four Films from Sam Katzman set. The other films included were Creature with the Atom Brain, The Werewolf, and The Zombies of Mora Tau.

See also
 List of American films of 1957
Z movie
List of Columbia Pictures films
 The Flying SerpentReferences

Notes

Citations

Bibliography

 Walker, John, ed. Halliwell's Who's Who in the Movies (14th ed.). New York: HarperResource, 1997. .
 Warren, Bill. Keep Watching the Skies: Science Fiction Films of the Fifties'', 21st Century Edition. 2009. Jefferson, North Carolina: McFarland & Company,(First Editions Vol. 1, 1982, Vol. 2, 1986). .

External links

 
 
 
Joe Dante on The Giant Claw at Trailers from Hell
 

1957 films
1950s science fiction horror films
American science fiction horror films
Giant monster films
1950s monster movies
Columbia Pictures films
Films directed by Fred F. Sears
Puppet films
American black-and-white films
Horror films about birds
Alien visitations in films
Alien invasions in films
Films shot in Los Angeles
American exploitation films
1950s English-language films
1950s American films